Giuseppe Zorzi (25 March 1938 – 2 April 2019) was an Italian racing cyclist. He rode in the 1962 Tour de France.

References

External links
 

1938 births
2019 deaths
Italian male cyclists
Cyclists from Bologna